Sabzabad may refer to:
 Sabzabad, Neyriz, Fars Province
 Sabzabad, Shiraz, Fars Province
 Sabzabad, Hamadan
 Sabzabad, Isfahan
 Sabzabad, Tombi Golgir, Khuzestan Province
 Sabzabad-e Olya, Tombi Golgir Rural District
 Sabzabad-e Sofla, Tombi Golgir Rural District
 Sabzabad, Markazi